sj Miller (born March 20, 1970) is an American academic, public speaker, social justice activist, Professor of Teacher Education at the Santa Fe Community College. Miller is agender and does not use any personal pronouns.

Early life and education 
Miller was born in New Orleans, Louisiana, and grew up in Santa Fe, New Mexico, attending Santa Fe High School. Miller taught middle and high school English for eight years before going on to earn a PhD in Educational Thought and Socio-Cultural Studies from the University of New Mexico.

Miller medically transitioned from female toward male while working as an assistant professor at Indiana University of Pennsylvania. Miller was disowned by a father after coming out as agender-transgender.

Career 
Miller has held teaching positions at Indiana University of Pennsylvania and University of Missouri-Kansas City. Miller served as an associate professor of literary studies at University of Colorado Boulder.

In the fall of 2010, Miller helped draft the Beliefs Statement about Social Justice in English Education and helped pass the Resolution on Social Justice in Literacy Education, which informed the newly-vetted CAEP Social Justice Standard 6-the first ever standard in the United States that advances social justice work in teacher preparation for the National Council of Teachers of English. In April 2016, Miller was selected for a project hosted by UNESCO-MGIEP (Mahatma Gandhi Institute of Education for Peace and Sustainable Development) to integrate social justice education into the mainstream school curriculum.

In 2016, Miller was hired as Deputy Director of Educational Equity at the Steinhardt School of Culture, Education, and Human Development at New York University.

As of 2022, Miller is a Professor of Teacher Education in the Teacher Academy at Santa Fe Community College, Santa Fe, New Mexico. Beginning in Autumn 2022, Miller is additionally teaching online courses in the teacher education program at the University of Washington Bothell School of Educational Studies.

Advocacy 
Miller has written and spoken nationally and internationally about the impact of bullying on youth, particularly young people whose gender identities are nonconforming and those in the LGBTQ community.

Following the Donald Trump administration's withdrawal of federal guidance on gender identity under Title IX, Miller spoke out in support of transgender youth in a February 2017 interview on CBSN.

In March 2017, Miller was featured in the CBSN documentary Gender: The Space Between, which focused on gender fluidity.

In 2018, Miller gave the TEDMED talk: Why Gender Identity Justice Matters for Everyone.

Selected books 

 Miller, s. (2019). about gender identity justice in schools and communities. New York: Teacher College Press.
 Miller, s. Mayo, C., Hoskin, R., & Green, J. (2019). Navigating trans*+ and complex gender identities. Bloomsbury: U.K.
 Miller, s., & Rodriguez, N. (Eds.). (2016). Educators queering academia: Critical memoirs. New York: Peter Lang.
 Miller, s. (Ed.). (2018). Enseñando, afirmando, y reconociendo a jóvenes trans* y de género creative: Un marco de enseñanza queer(A. Stevenson Valdés, Trans). Santiago: Ediciones Universidad Alberto Hurtado.
 Miller, s. (Ed.). (2016). Teaching, affirming, and recognizing trans and gender creative youth: A queer literacy framework. New York: PalgraveMacmillan.
 Miller, s., Burns, L., & Johnson, T.S. (2013). Generation BULLIED 2.0: Prevention and intervention strategies for our most vulnerable students.  New York: Peter Lang. 
 Miller, s. & Kirkland, D. (Eds.). (2010). Change matters: Critical essays on moving social justice research from theory to policy. New York: Peter Lang.
 Miller, s., Beliveau, L., DeStigter, T., Kirkland, D., & Rice, P. (2008). Narratives of social justice teaching: How English teachers negotiate theory and practice between preservice and inservice spaces. New York: Peter Lang. 
 Miller, s., & Norris, L. (2007). Unpacking the loaded teacher matrix: Negotiating space and time between university and secondary English classrooms. New York: Peter Lang.

Selected publications 

 

 
Burns, L., & Miller, s. (2017). Social justice policymaking in teacher education from conception to application: Realizing Standard VI. Teachers College Record, 119(2), 1-38.
Miller, s., Mayo, C., & Lugg, C. (2017). Sex and gender in transition in US schools: Ways forward. Sex Education, 18(4), 345-359.
National Council Teachers of English. (2018). NCTE statement on gender and language. Urbana: IL.
Miller, s. (2018). Reframing schooling to liberate gender identity. Multicultural Perspectives, 20(2), 70-80
Poteat, P.V., Calzo. P.J., Yoshikawa, H., Miller, s., Ceccolini, C., Rosenbach, S., & Mauceri, N. (2018). Discussing transgender topics within gay-straight alliances: Factors that could promote more frequent conversations. International Journal of Transgenderism. Accessed from https://doi.org/10.1080/15532739.2017.1407983
Miller, s. (2018). Gender identityWOKE: A theory of trans*+ for animating literacy practices. In D. Alvermann, NJ Unrau, M. Sailors and R. Ruddell (Eds.), Theoretical models and processes of literacy edition 7 (pp. 403–418). New York: Routledge.
Miller, s. (2019). The impact and role of emotions in schools for teachers and students with complex gender identities. Teachers College Record,121 (13). 
Miller, s. (2019) Trans*+ and gender identity diverse students' right to use a Bathroom: Debating human dignity. In M. Levinson and J. Fay (Eds.), Democratic discord in schools: Cases and commentaries in educational ethics (pp. 191–194.). Cambridge, MA: Harvard Press.
Miller, s. (2020). Gender identity complexities turn. GLQ: A Journal of Lesbian and Gay Studies,26 (2), 239-242.
Miller, s. (2020). Gender Identity is trans-sectional turn: Expanding the theory of trans*ness into literacy practice. In C. Mayo and M. Blackburn (Eds.), Queer, trans and intersectional theory in educational practice ( pp. 35–49). New York: Routledge.

Selected awards and recognition 
 2005: Paul and Kate Farmer English Journal Writing Award, Article of the Year, "Shattering Images of Violence in Young Adult Literature: Strategies for the Classroom"
 2007: Richard A. Meade award, National Council on Teacher Education, "Unpacking the Loaded Teacher Matrix: Negotiating Space and Time Between University and Secondary English Classrooms"
 2015: Joanne Arnold Courage and Commitment Award, University of Colorado Boulder
 2017: Exemplary Research Award, American Educational Research Association, Division K, Teaching and Teacher Education, "Teaching, Affirming and Recognizing Trans and Gender Creative Youth: A Queer Literacy Framework"
2018: Outstanding Book Award, Michigan Council Teachers of English Teaching, Affirming and Recognizing Trans and Gender Creative Youth: A  A Queer Literacy Framework
2019: AERA Distinguished Contributions to Gender Equity in Education Research Award

Book series Editor 

 Miller, s. (Ed.). Spaces In-between: Beyond Binary Gender Identities and Sexualities Series. Teachers College Press: New York, NY.
 Miller, s. & Burns, L. (Eds.). Social Justice Across Contexts in Education. Peter Lang: New York, NY.

Personal life 
Miller enjoys participating in sports and fitness activities, including swimming, running, and cycling, and was formerly an All-American high school soccer player who played Division 1 Soccer at U.C. Berkeley.

References

External links 

1970 births
Transgender non-binary people
American LGBT rights activists
LGBT people from New Mexico
Living people
People from Santa Fe, New Mexico
Steinhardt School of Culture, Education, and Human Development faculty
Transgender writers
University of New Mexico alumni
Transgender academics
Transgender studies academics
Non-binary writers
Non-binary activists
Agender people